Just Music were a West German avant-garde music ensemble, an interchangeable collective of classically trained instrumentalists founded at the , Frankfurt/Main in 1967 by multi-instrumentalist Alfred Harth. An inherent anti-commercial bias kept them at arm's length from the mainstream music business, enabling them to experiment at will. "Ein Modell fuer annaehernd herrschaftsfreie Kommunikation und Interaktion" (Flyer, March 1969). Just Music changed their name several times depending on the context.

Other names are New Thing Orchestra, Free Jazz Orkestra Frankfurt, Panta Rei and urKult.

History
Alfred Harth had founded the club H in 1965 and then the meeting point and platform  in Frankfurt/Main starting with his essay "On Synaesthetics" in 1967 and the vision of synthesizing avant-garde art, avant-garde music and avant-garde literature. It became an open exchange and performance place for young experimental artists, poets and musicians in the Frankfurt area with the Just Music ensemble as a main creative pool. American clarinetist Tony Scott played there with Just Music and also in the following years Harth and Just Music kept open to perform with many others as the German musicians trumpetist and composer Michael Sell (with the Free Jazz Group Wiesbaden), saxophonist Peter Brötzmann and tuba and bassplayer Peter Kowald, Czech flutist Jiri Stivin, members of the AACM, Polish violinist Zbigniew Seifert, American saxophonist Anthony Braxton a.o.
In 1969, Just Music recorded the 2nd LP (1002) for Manfred Eicher's label ECM and Thomas Cremer, Harth and Thomas Stöwsand made a joint performance with the Nicole Van den Plas Trio from Belgium at the San Sebastian Jazz Festival in Spain. From then on  Just Music also worked in cooperation with members of the Nicole Van den Plas Trio. In 1971 Harth and Van den Plas started to focus on duo works and in 1972 with guests as Peter Kowald and drummer Paul Lovens a.o. in Belgium which later in the same year lead to the foundation of the group E.M.T. when Just Music had performed their last concerts with partly exchanged members in Poland.

Music
Just Music's repertoire included written scores and graphic notation by Alfred Harth in the very beginning and then free improvisation. It incorporated elements of jazz, classical music, fluxus, dada, happening and the avant-garde.
Their music was mostly experimental, making classification all but impossible and contained an extreme variety of timbres and dynamics at the basis of a spontaneous expression. Process was more important than a result. Just Music partly incorporated their audiences.

Concept
Since the mid-1960s Alfred Harth was open to all creative horizons influenced by the Stuttgarter Schule around Max Bense, zen and the fluxus events in nearby Wiesbaden. He treated breaking glass, thunder and rain, fireworks or everyday tool's noises as equal synaesthetic manifestations. Harth co-created a toneless wind instrument concept during a studio production at the Hessischer Rundfunk, experimented muting his saxophones with all kinds of stuff even from outside the keys by covering the saxophone with clothes and implemented backward recorded accordion live on cassette. Johannes Krämer was using a wide variety of unorthodox guitar tunings, and preparing guitars with objects like drumsticks and screwdrivers to alter the instruments' timbre.
On the other hand Just Music had formed the political fraction  urKult who demonstrated against the "unilateral presentation and consumption of New Music without political implications" before or even during other relevant concert events and by this provoked the ivory tower of the nearby Darmstädter Ferienkurse events as well as music businesses "as instruments of the establishment".

Name
Just Music is almost a German expression. The name was chosen by Alfred Harth to express that there shall be no pressure for anything. Just Music strictly avoided titles for their works and even several times changed their group name.

Performances (selection)

1967
 at composer Dieter Schnebel's concert series for atonal  music in Frankfurt/Main
1968 
at the main cathedral, Dom, in Frankfurt/Main
 TV-Feature with concrete poet Franz Mon in Mainz
at the Liederhalle, Mozartsaal, Stuttgart, radio recorded by Süddeutscher Rundfunk (SDR)
concert managed by Siegfried Schmidt-Joos in Düsseldorf
 performs Christian Wolff's "Play" from the  Prose Collection  at the Theater am Turm (TAT), Frankfurt/Main
studio production at the Frankfurt radio, Hessischer Rundfunk, plus interview with Alfred Harth
1969 
 at the Rational Theater in Munich (first concert together with Thomas Stoewsand who then moved to Frankfurt and stayed member until the last concerts in Poland)
at the Action Center  in Munich
at the Jazzfestival San Sebastian, Spain, in cooperation with the Nicole Van den Plas Trio  from Belgium
at the Stadttheater Bremerhaven
1970
 radio play Alles wie zuvor  in cooperation with composer Aleida Montijn produced at the radio Frankfurt/Main, Hessischer Rundfunk
at the 12th German Jazzfestival in Frankfurt/Main
at the 12th German Jazzfestival with the European Free Jazz Orchestra (A.Harth, P.Stock) conducted by members of the AACM
at the Jazzfestival Přerov (with N. Van den Plas, A.De Tiege) and with Jiri Stivin in Prague, Czechoslovakia
live at the radio Prague, Czechoslovakia
one month daily at the Theatre Lucernaire, Paris, France (with Eugene Broeckhoven)
two weeks daily at the theatre festival, Théâtre de la Recherche, in Avignon, France, (with J.Van den Plas)
at the Jazzfestival Bilzen (Cremer, Harth, Stoewsand), Belgium
studio production at the Frankfurt radio, Hessischer Rundfunk, with Peter Kowald, Heinz Sauer, Michael Sell, N. Van den Plas a.o.
1971 
in Breda, Netherlands
at the Belgian Radio, BRT
 at the Jazzfestival Ghent as Panta Rei (with N. and J. Van den Plas), Belgium
at the  Action Center, Munich, session with Anthony Braxton, Cremer, Harth, Stoewsand
concert in München with Cremer, Manfred Eicher (bass), Harth, Stoewsand, N. Van den Plas
studio production at the Frankfurt radio, Hessischer Rundfunk, with Peter Brötzmann, N. Van den Plas a.o.
at the Festival Jazz nad Odra, Wrocław, Poland
in Kraków with violinist Zbigniew Seifert and at the University Warsaw, Poland, (with Herwig Pöschl)
1972 
at the Palais des Beaux-Arts (Cremer, Harth, N. Van den Plas, Volhard), Brussels, Belgium, recorded for a radio program curated by Fred Van Hove
2009
revival at the festival ROT in Frankfurt/Main - Just Music skips to ROT from 1969 with Alfred Harth, Johannes Krämer, Nicole Van den Plas, Peter Stock, Witold Teplitz, Franz Volhard, radio recorded by the Hessischer Rundfunk

Personnel 

Eugene Broeckhoven (Belgium) - drums
Thomas Cremer – drums, clarinet, voice
Andre De Tiege (Belgium) - bass
Ronnie Dusoir (Belgium) - dr
Alfred Harth  – tenor sax, clarinet, bass clarinet, trumpet, voice, misc.
Dieter Herrmann – trombone
Johannes Krämer – guitar, voice
Herwig Pöschl (Austria) – drums
Hans Schwindt - clarinet, altosax
Peter Stock – bass
Thomas Stoewsand – cello, flutes, voice
Witold Teplitz – violin, clarinet
Franz Volhard – cello
Jean Van den Plas (Belgium) – cello, bass
Nicole Van den Plas (Belgium) - piano
Edmond Van Lierde (Belgium) - altosax

Discography
  Just Music, self-produced LP, 300 items, 1969
  Just Music ECM 1002, 1969 (cover art)
  Born Free Scout ScS-11, 1970
  4.Januar 1970, LP selfproduction, 300 items, 1970
   Four CDRs with archive material from 1968-1971 by Just Music,(>Laubhuette Productions<), 2009

References
Jürgen Schwab: Der Frankfurt-Sound. Eine Stadt und ihre Jazzgeschichte(n). Frankfurt/Main: Societäts-Verlag, 2005, with 2 CDs,
Steve Lake, Paul Griffiths:"Horizons Touched - The Music of ECM", Granta Books, London
Christoph Wagner: Brüche und Kontinuität, Alfred 23 Harth, in "Neue Zeitschrift für Musik", Schott Music, Mainz, Germany, 6/2007
Clifford Allen in All About Jazz
Julian Cowley: ...this is absorbing music, in itself and as a readjustment of the familiar historical picture.  The Wire, 55, 2009.
Clifford Allen: ...this was music of a moment in time.We can be thankful some of it has been preserved.  Signal To Noise #55, 2009.
ECM Records Discography 
CBS Scout ScS11, LP Born free: 12 German jazz festival 
Just Music LP Selfrelease,1969 
Just Music photos 

German experimental musical groups
Musical groups established in 1967
Avant-garde ensembles
Free improvisation ensembles
ECM Records artists